Pre-1927 Route 18 was a route in New Jersey that ran from Camden east to Toms River, existing from 1923 to 1927. Today, it is part of the following routes:
 New Jersey Route 38
 New Jersey Route 37

18 (pre-1927)